Seven Stars is a basketball club based in the city of Praia on the island of Santiago, Cape Verde. The team is a member of the Santiago South Regional Basketball Association.

The club won a few regional titles with their last in 2017. One of the national titles won by the team was in 2011.

Logo
Its logo color is light blue and has the number seven.

Uniform
Its uniform colors are light blue and white.

Arena

The team plays at Gimnodesportivo Vava Duarte in Gamboa, Praia just south of Estádio da Várzea and the city center. Teams based in the city that play in the arena are ABC. All other teams based in a subdivision in Praia or the south of the island including AD Bairro play at the arena.

Honours
Santiago South Basketball Championships: 2 listed
2011, 2017

Cape Verdean Basketball Championships: 1 listed
2011

Statistics
Best position: 1st (national)

References

External links
Seven Stars at League Line-Up
Seven Stars at Sports Mídia 

Basketball teams in Cape Verde
Sport in Praia